Sevak may refer to:
 Sevag, an Armenian name
 Sewak, several meanings
 Sevak, Sanskrit term for servant, see seva (Indian religions)